Saint-Mathieu-du-Parc is a municipality in the Mauricie region of the province of Quebec in Canada.  Prior to March 28, 1998, it was known simply as Saint-Mathieu.

It is home to the Mokotakan Museum, showcasing the First Nations of Quebec.

References

External links
 

Incorporated places in Mauricie
Municipalities in Quebec